Susuwahi is a census town in Varanasi tehsil of  Varanasi district in the Indian state of Uttar Pradesh. The census town falls under  the Susuwahi gram panchayat.  Susuwahi Census town is about 12 kilometers South of Varanasi railway station, 320 kilometers South-East of  Lucknow and 5 kilometers South-West of Banaras Hindu University main  gate.

Demography
Susuwahi  has 1,781 families with a total population of 10,454. Sex ratio of the census town is 923 and child sex ratio is 835. Uttar Pradesh state average for both ratios is 912 and 902 respectively  .

Transportation
Susuwahi  is connected by air (Lal Bahadur Shastri Airport), by train (Banaras railway station) and by road. Nearest operational airports is Lal Bahadur Shastri Airport and nearest operational railway station is Banaras (38 and 7.5 kilometers respectively from  Susuwahi).

See also
 Varanasi Cantt. (Assembly constituency)
 Varanasi (Lok Sabha constituency)

Notes
  All  demographic data is based on 2011 Census of India.

References 

Census towns in Varanasi district